The Chelkou Game Reserve is a game reserve established in 1939 in South Sudan. The savannah woodland habitat features key species of Elephant, giant eland, and buffalo. 

The highest and the most prominent mountain is Jabal Kurkura.

References

Game reserves of South Sudan